Pennsylvania State Senate District 21 includes parts of Butler County and Erie County and all of Clarion County, Forest County, Venango County, and Warren County. It is currently represented by Republican Scott Hutchinson.

District profile
The district includes the following areas:

Butler County

 Allegheny Township
 Brady Township
 Bruin
 Buffalo Township
 Butler
 Butler Township
 Center Township
 Cherry Township
 Cherry Valley
 Chicora
 Clay Township
 Clearfield Township
 Clinton Township
 Concord Township
 Connoquenessing
 Connoquenessing Township
 Donegal Township
 East Butler
 Eau Claire
 Fairview
 Fairview Township
 Franklin Township
 Harrisville
 Jefferson Township
 Karns City
 Marion Township
 Mercer Township
 Muddy Creek Township
 Oakland Township
 Parker Township
 Penn Township
 Petrolia
 Portersville
 Prospect
 Saxonburg
 Slippery Rock
 Slippery Rock Township
 Summit Township
 Venango Township
 Washington Township
 West Liberty
 West Sunbury
 Winfield Township
 Worth Township

All of Clarion County

Erie County

 Concord Township
 Corry
 Elgin
 Wayne Township

All of Forest county

All of Venango County

All of Warren County

Senators

References

Pennsylvania Senate districts
Government of Butler County, Pennsylvania
Government of Clarion County, Pennsylvania
Government of Forest County, Pennsylvania
Government of Venango County, Pennsylvania
Government of Warren County, Pennsylvania